Blue Water, White Death is a 1971 American documentary about sharks which was directed by Peter Gimbel and	
James Lipscomb. It received favourable reviews and was described as a "well produced odyssey" and "exciting and often beautiful". It screened theatrically and was broadcast on television at various times during the 1970s and 1980s. The film was re-released on DVD in 2009.

Cast and crew
The following people appeared in the documentary – Tom Chapin, Phil Clarkson, Stuart Cody, Peter Lake, Peter Matthiessen, Rodney Fox, Valerie Taylor, Ron Taylor, Stan Waterman, Peter Gimbel, James Lipscomb and Rodney Jonklaas. In 1986 Tom Chapin reflected on his role as an assistant cameraman on the production, joking that his life had "all been downhill since." Some underwater sequences appearing in the film were shot using shark-proof cages.

See also
 List of American films of 1971
Dangerous Reef

References

External links

1971 films
Documentary films about marine biology
Films about sharks
1971 documentary films
American documentary films
Films about shark attacks
Cinema Center Films films
1970s English-language films
1970s American films